Pilocrocis dohrnialis is a moth in the family Crambidae. It was described by Hering in 1901. It is found in Indonesia (Sumatra).

References

Pilocrocis
Moths described in 1901
Moths of Indonesia